The 2014 season is Associação Portuguesa de Desportos' ninety third season in existence and the club's first consecutive season in the second level of Brazilian football.

STJD issues
Although Portuguesa finished the championship just above the relegation positions, it was punished by the Superior Court of Sport Justice for irregularly calling in a player during a match against Grêmio - Héverton, who was suspended for a red card received at his previous Copa do Brasil match. With the punishment, the team lost four points - three for the irregular usage of a player and a fourth one which the team won due to the game resulting in a tie - and ended up being relegated. This way, Fluminense FC managed to finish the championship above the relegation positions and was spared from having to compete in the next year's second division for the third time on the last 2 decades.

On 10 January 2014, a supporter from the club won a lawsuit in São Paulo's courts, which determines the points would be returned to Portuguesa, relegating Fluminense. However, CBF refused to accept the lawsuit, and published the 2014 Série A table without Lusa, placing the club in Série B instead.

Managers rotation
Only in a year, Portuguesa had five full-time managers (Guto Ferreira, Argel Fucks, Marcelo Veiga, Silas and Vágner Benazzi) and also one caretaker (Zé Augusto). All but the latter were sacked due to poor results.

Players

Squad information

Appearances and goals

Last updated: 29 November 2014
Source: Match reports in Competitive matches, Soccerway

Goalscorers

Last updated: 29 November 2014
Source: Match reports in Competitive matches

Disciplinary record

Injuries

Transfers

In

Total spending:  R$0

Out

Total gaining:  R$1,300,000

Competitions

Campeonato Paulista

Matches

Copa do Brasil

Potiguar progressed through the away goal system.

Campeonato Brasileiro

League table

Matches

References

External links
Official Site 
LusaNews - blog 

2014 season
Associação Portuguesa de Desportos seasons
Brazilian football clubs 2014 season